Waterfoot railway station served Waterfoot, Rossendale near Rawtenstall, Lancashire, England from 1848 until the line closed in 1966.

History
Construction began in 1847, and it was intended that it would be completed by 1 December the same year. The route required tunnels beyond Newchurch, and the expense of these meant that construction was curtailed, and the line was opened as far as Newchurch, where a station was opened on 27 March 1848.

Construction of the line onwards to Bacup resumed in 1851, and this was opened on 1 October 1852. The ELR amalgamated with the Lancashire and Yorkshire Railway on 13 May 1859. The whole line between Rawtenstall and Bacup was single-track at first; work to double the track began in 1878, and was completed in 1881.

The station, originally named Newchurch, was renamed Waterfoot for Newchurch on 1 August 1881; and the name was simplified to Waterfoot by 1922.

The station was closed on 5 December 1966.

Route

References

Further reading
Lost Railways of Lancashire by Gordon Suggitt

Disused railway stations in the Borough of Rossendale
Former Lancashire and Yorkshire Railway stations
Railway stations in Great Britain opened in 1848
Railway stations in Great Britain closed in 1966
Beeching closures in England